Padew Narodowa  is a village in Mielec County, Subcarpathian Voivodeship, in south-eastern Poland. It is the seat of the gmina (administrative district) called Gmina Padew Narodowa.

The village has a population of 2,300.

References

Padew Narodowa